The 2021 Lisbon local election was held on 26 September 2021 to elect the members of the Lisbon City Council.

In what was the biggest surprise of the 2021 municipal elections, Carlos Moedas, the candidate of the center-right coalition led by the Social Democratic Party, managed to be elected Mayor of Lisbon and put an end to 14 years of Socialist rule. Against all expectations, the center-right coalition managed to regain the capital by winning 34.3% of the votes and 7 councilors. Despite his victory, Carlos Moedas will have to seek understandings with the other parties represented in the City Council.

The big loser in this election was Fernando Medina, candidate of the Socialist Party (which ran in alliance with LIVRE), as he lost his reelection bid, an office he had hold since 2015 and which had been in Socialist hands since 2007. Unexpectedly, the Socialists lost almost 10% of the votes, compared with the previous election, with Medina labeling the defeat as "personal".

The Unitary Democratic Coalition presented former MEP João Ferreira again and achieved positive results, registering a slight electoral growth to 10.5%, the best result for CDU since 2005, and that guaranteed two Communist councilors. The Left Bloc, which now supported Beatriz Gomes Dias as a candidate for mayor, managed to keep their sole seat in the municipal council, despite having registered a slight drop in votes.

People-Animals-Nature, CHEGA, and Liberal Initiative failed to elect any councilor.

Background 
In the 2017 election, the Socialist Party led by Fernando Medina, won with a comfortable advantage over the opposition parties, although losing its absolute majority. The center-right wing alliance led by Assunção Cristas' CDS - Peoples Party obtained a historic result for the chamber, surpassing 20% ​​of the votes and electing 4 councilors. The Social Democratic Party, which had Teresa Leal Coelho as its candidate, had its worst result in history in Lisbon, finishing in third place, with just over 11% of the votes and 2 councilors, a far cry from the Socialists and Christian Democrats (CDS). 

Finally, the Unitary Democratic Coalition obtained 9.6%, winning 2 councilors and the Left Bloc obtained its best municipal result in the capital, managing to conquer 1 councilor with 7.1% and entering in a coalition with the Socialists.

Electoral system 
Each party or coalition must present a list of candidates. The lists are closed and the seats in each municipality are apportioned according to the D'Hondt method. Unlike in national legislative elections, independent lists are allowed to run.

Parties and candidates

Campaign period

Party slogans

Candidates' debates

Opinion polling

Graphical summary

Polling

Results

Municipal Council 

|-
| colspan="11" style="text-align:center;" | 
|-
! rowspan="2" colspan=2 style="background-color:#E9E9E9" align=left|Parties
! rowspan="2" style="background-color:#E9E9E9" align=right|Votes
! rowspan="2" style="background-color:#E9E9E9" align=right|%
! rowspan="2" style="background-color:#E9E9E9" align=right|±pp swing
! colspan="2" style="background-color:#E9E9E9" align="center"|Councillors
|- style="background-color:#E9E9E9"
! style="background-color:#E9E9E9" align="center"|Total
! style="background-color:#E9E9E9" align="center"|±
|-
|style="width: 9px" bgcolor=#2A52BE align="center" | 
|align=left|PSD / CDS–PP / Alliance / MPT / PPM
|83,163||34.26||2.5||7||1
|-
|style="width: 9px" bgcolor=#FF3366 align="center" |
|align=left|Socialist / LIVRE
|80,869||33.31||8.7||7||1
|-
| 
|25,520||10.51||1.0||2||0
|-
| 
|15,054||6.20||0.9||1||0
|-
|style="width: 9px" bgcolor=#202056 align="center" | 
|align=left|CHEGA
|10,713||4.41||||0||
|-
|style="width: 9px" bgcolor=#00ADEF align="center" | 
|align=left|Liberal Initiative
|10,238||4.22||||0||
|-
| 
|6,625||2.73||0.3||0||0
|-
|style="width: 9px" bgcolor=Purple align="center" | 
|align=left|Volt Portugal
|1,011||0.42||||0||
|-
|style="width: 8px" bgcolor=gray align="center" | 
|align=left|We are all Lisbon (STL)
|864||0.36||||0||
|-
|style="width: 9px" bgcolor=gold align="center" | 
|align=left|We, the Citizens! 
|530||0.22||0.4||0||0
|-
| 
|339||0.14||0.4||0||0
|-
|style="width: 9px" bgcolor=black align="center" | 
|align=left|Democratic Republican
|319||0.13||0.2||0||0
|-
|colspan=2 width="330" align=left style="background-color:#E9E9E9"|Total valid
|width="50" align="right" style="background-color:#E9E9E9"|235,245
|width="40" align="right" style="background-color:#E9E9E9"|96.91
|width="40" align="right" style="background-color:#E9E9E9"|1.1
|width="40" align="right" style="background-color:#E9E9E9"|17
|width="40" align="right" style="background-color:#E9E9E9"|0
|-
|colspan=2|Blank ballots
|4,818||1.98||0.6||colspan=3 rowspan=4|
|-
|colspan=2|Invalid ballots
|2,688||1.11||0.4
|-
|colspan=2 align=left style="background-color:#E9E9E9"|Total
|width="50" align="right" style="background-color:#E9E9E9"|242,751
|width="40" align="right" style="background-color:#E9E9E9"|100.00
|width="40" align="right" style="background-color:#E9E9E9"|
|-
|colspan=2|Registered voters/turnout
||476,750||50.92||0.2
|-
| colspan=11 align=left | Source: Lisbon 2021 election results
|}

Municipal Assembly 

|-
| colspan="11" style="text-align:center;" | 
|-
! rowspan="2" colspan=2 style="background-color:#E9E9E9" align=left|Parties
! rowspan="2" style="background-color:#E9E9E9" align=right|Votes
! rowspan="2" style="background-color:#E9E9E9" align=right|%
! rowspan="2" style="background-color:#E9E9E9" align=right|±pp swing
! colspan="2" style="background-color:#E9E9E9" align="center"|Seats
|- style="background-color:#E9E9E9"
! style="background-color:#E9E9E9" align="center"|Total
! style="background-color:#E9E9E9" align="center"|±
|-
|style="width: 9px" bgcolor=#2A52BE align="center" | 
|align=left|PSD / CDS–PP / Alliance / MPT / PPM
|75,717||31.18||0.9||17||0
|-
|style="width: 9px" bgcolor=#FF3366 align="center" |
|align=left|Socialist / LIVRE
|74,768||30.79||6.9||17||5
|-
| 
|26,873||11.07||0.9||6||0
|-
| 
|18,514||7.62||0.8||4||0
|-
|style="width: 9px" bgcolor=#00ADEF align="center" | 
|align=left|Liberal Initiative
|14,431||5.94||||3||
|-
|style="width: 9px" bgcolor=#202056 align="center" | 
|align=left|CHEGA
|12,996||5.35||||3||
|-
| 
|8,566||3.53||0.8||1||1
|-
|style="width: 9px" bgcolor=Purple align="center" | 
|align=left|Volt Portugal
|1,398||0.58||||0||
|-
|style="width: 8px" bgcolor=gray align="center" | 
|align=left|We are all Lisbon (STL)
|1,068||0.44||||0||
|-
| 
|437||0.18||0.4||0||0
|-
|colspan=2 width="330" align=left style="background-color:#E9E9E9"|Total valid
|width="50" align="right" style="background-color:#E9E9E9"|234,768
|width="40" align="right" style="background-color:#E9E9E9"|96.67
|width="40" align="right" style="background-color:#E9E9E9"|1.1
|width="40" align="right" style="background-color:#E9E9E9"|51
|width="40" align="right" style="background-color:#E9E9E9"|0
|-
|colspan=2|Blank ballots
|5,331||2.20||0.7||colspan=3 rowspan=4|
|-
|colspan=2|Invalid ballots
|2,742||1.13||0.4
|-
|colspan=2 align=left style="background-color:#E9E9E9"|Total
|width="50" align="right" style="background-color:#E9E9E9"|242,841
|width="40" align="right" style="background-color:#E9E9E9"|100.00
|width="40" align="right" style="background-color:#E9E9E9"|
|-
|colspan=2|Registered voters/turnout
||476,750||50.94||0.2
|-
| colspan=11 align=left | Source: Lisbon 2021 election results
|}

Parish Assemblies

|- class="unsortable"
!rowspan=2|Parish!!%!!S!!%!!S!!%!!S!!%!!S!!%!!S!!%!!S!!%!!S!!%!!S
!rowspan=2|TotalS
|- class="unsortable" style="text-align:center;"
!colspan=2 | ML
!colspan=2 | NT
!colspan=2 | CDU
!colspan=2 | BE
!colspan=2 | IL
!colspan=2 | CH
!colspan=2 | PAN
!colspan=2 | IND
|-
| style="text-align:left;" | Ajuda
| style="background:#FF3366; color:white;"| 51.5
| 8
| 15.9
| 2
| 13.6
| 2
| 6.5
| 1
| 3.6
| -
| 5.5
| -
| colspan="4" bgcolor="#AAAAAA"|
| 13
|-
| style="text-align:left;" | Alcântara
| style="background:#FF3366; color:white;"| 53.7
| 8
| 18.8
| 3
| 9.3
| 1
| 5.3
| -
| 6.2
| 1
| 3.8
| -
| colspan="4" bgcolor="#AAAAAA"|
| 13
|-
| style="text-align:left;" | Alvalade
| 28.6
| 6
| style="background:#2A52BE; color:white;"| 33.2
| 7
| 8.6
| 2
| 6.4
| 1
| 6.4
| 1
| 4.2
| 1
| colspan="2" bgcolor="#AAAAAA"|
| 5.0
| 1
| 19
|-
| style="text-align:left;" | Areeiro
| 25.9
| 4
| style="background:#2A52BE; color:white;"| 42.6
| 7
| 7.7
| 1
| 5.8
| -
| 7.0
| 1
| 4.6
| -
| 3.4
| -
| colspan="2" bgcolor="#AAAAAA"|
| 13
|-
| style="text-align:left;" | Arroios
| 23.8
| 5
| style="background:#2A52BE; color:white;"| 29.0
| 6
| 12.5
| 3
| 10.7
| 2
| 5.5
| 1
| 4.2
| 1
| 5.4
| 1
| 3.6
| -
| 19
|-
| style="text-align:left;" | Avenidas Novas
| 26.8
| 5
| style="background:#2A52BE; color:white;"| 43.0
| 9
| 6.9
| 1
| 5.8
| 1
| 9.1
| 2
| 4.8
| 1
| colspan="4" bgcolor="#AAAAAA"|
| 19
|-
| style="text-align:left;" | Beato
| style="background:#FF3366; color:white;"| 39.5
| 6
| 18.2
| 3
| 13.0
| 2
| 9.4
| 1
| 2.5
| -
| 7.5
| 1
| colspan="2" bgcolor="#AAAAAA"|
| 5.8
| -
| 13
|-
| style="text-align:left;" | Belém
| 24.2
| 4
| style="background:#2A52BE; color:white;"| 46.4
| 7
| 6.6
| 1
| 4.0
| -
| 8.6
| 1
| 4.8
| -
| 2.6
| -
| colspan="2" bgcolor="#AAAAAA"|
| 13
|-
| style="text-align:left;" | Benfica
| style="background:#FF3366; color:white;"| 45.6
| 10
| 23.7
| 5
| 8.9
| 2
| 6.5
| 1
| 3.8
| -
| 5.0
| 1
| 3.3
| -
| colspan="2" bgcolor="#AAAAAA"|
| 19
|-
| style="text-align:left;" | Campo de Ourique
| style="background:#FF3366; color:white;"| 34.3
| 5
| 34.0
| 5
| 8.8
| 1
| 7.5
| 1
| 6.4
| 1
| 4.8
| -
| colspan="4" bgcolor="#AAAAAA"|
| 13
|-
| style="text-align:left;" | Campolide
| style="background:#FF3366; color:white;"| 38.9
| 6
| 25.7
| 4
| 9.0
| 1
| 6.8
| 1
| 6.8
| 1
| 5.5
| -
| 3.7
| -
| colspan="2" bgcolor="#AAAAAA"|
| 13
|-
| style="text-align:left;" | Carnide
| 18.2
| 3
| 20.1
| 3
| style="background:#FF0000; color:white;"| 45.5
| 7
| 3.3
| -
| 3.5
| -
| 3.8
| -
| 2.1
| -
| colspan="2" bgcolor="#AAAAAA"|
| 13
|-
| style="text-align:left;" | Estrela
| 23.7
| 3
| style="background:#2A52BE; color:white;"| 47.8
| 8
| 7.1
| 1
| 5.6
| -
| 7.3
| 1
| 5.3
| -
| colspan="4" bgcolor="#AAAAAA"|
| 13
|-
| style="text-align:left;" | Lumiar
| 27.1
| 6
| style="background:#2A52BE; color:white;"| 41.3
| 9
| 8.7
| 1
| 5.2
| 1
| 6.6
| 1
| 4.6
| 1
| 3.2
| -
| colspan="2" bgcolor="#AAAAAA"|
| 19
|-
| style="text-align:left;" | Marvila
| style="background:#FF3366; color:white;"| 48.5
| 11
| 13.7
| 3
| 11.7
| 2
| 6.9
| 1
| 2.4
| -
| 9.2
| 2
| 2.4
| -
| colspan="2" bgcolor="#AAAAAA"|
| 19
|-
| style="text-align:left;" | Misericórdia
| style="background:#FF3366; color:white;"| 33.1
| 6
| 27.4
| 4
| 12.3
| 2
| 10.6
| 1
| 5.1
| -
| 4.5
| -
| 4.0
| -
| colspan="2" bgcolor="#AAAAAA"|
| 13
|-
| style="text-align:left;" | Olivais
| style="background:#FF3366; color:white;"| 34.7
| 8
| 24.9
| 5
| 13.8
| 3
| 8.0
| 1
| 3.4
| -
| 6.8
| 1
| 4.5
| 1
| colspan="2" bgcolor="#AAAAAA"|
| 19
|-
| style="text-align:left;" | Parque das Nações
| 34.4
| 5
| style="background:#2A52BE; color:white;"| 35.8
| 6
| 7.4
| 1
| 4.2
| -
| 8.0
| 1
| 4.4
| -
| 2.8
| -
| colspan="2" bgcolor="#AAAAAA"|
| 13
|-
| style="text-align:left;" | Penha de França
| style="background:#FF3366; color:white;"| 37.0
| 8
| 20.6
| 4
| 13.5
| 3
| 11.2
| 2
| 3.8
| -
| 5.3
| 1
| 4.5
| 1
| colspan="2" bgcolor="#AAAAAA"|
| 19
|-
| style="text-align:left;" | Santa Clara
| style="background:#FF3366; color:white;"| 36.2
| 6
| 22.0
| 3
| 12.4
| 2
| 6.4
| 1
| 3.8
| -
| 11.2
| 1
| colspan="4" bgcolor="#AAAAAA"|
| 13
|-
| style="text-align:left;" | Santa Maria Maior
| style="background:#FF3366; color:white;"| 45.0
| 8
| 16.4
| 2
| 14.3
| 2
| 7.7
| 1
| 3.6
| -
| 4.2
| -
| 3.3
| -
| 1.4
| -
| 13
|-
| style="text-align:left;" | Santo António
| 23.6
| 3
| style="background:#2A52BE; color:white;"| 44.6
| 7
| 8.1
| 1
| 7.4
| 1
| 6.7
| 1
| 3.4
| -
| 3.4
| -
| colspan="2" bgcolor="#AAAAAA"|
| 13
|-
| style="text-align:left;" | São Domingos de Benfica
| 32.8
| 7
| style="background:#2A52BE; color:white;"| 35.3
| 8
| 8.6
| 2
| 6.1
| 1
| 5.8
| 1
| 4.2
| -
| 3.8
| -
| colspan="2" bgcolor="#AAAAAA"|
| 19
|-
| style="text-align:left;" | São Vicente
| style="background:#FF3366; color:white;"| 28.7
| 5
| 19.4
| 3
| 22.9
| 3
| 11.6
| 2
| 5.0
| -
| 3.5
| -
| 4.3
| -
| colspan="2" bgcolor="#AAAAAA"|
| 13
|- class="unsortable" style="background:#E9E9E9"
| style="text-align:left;" | Total
| style="background:#FF3366; color:white;"| 33.3
| 146
| 30.5
| 123
| 11.5
| 47
| 6.8
| 21
| 5.5
| 14
| 5.2
| 11
| 2.8
| 3
| 0.7
| 1
| 366
|-
| colspan=19 style="text-align:left;" | Source: Election Results
|}

References

Notes

External links
2021 local election results

Local and regional elections in Portugal
2021 elections in Portugal
Lisbon